Dennis Jerome Seeley (born November 28, 1989) is an American professional basketball player for BCM Gravelines-Dunkerque of the LNB Pro A. He played college basketball for California and Cal State Fullerton.

Professional career
After going undrafted in the 2013 NBA draft, Seeley joined the Los Angeles Lakers for the 2013 NBA Summer League. On July 27, 2013, he signed with Radnički Kragujevac of Serbia for the 2013–14 season. In February 2014, he left Radnički and signed with Medi Bayreuth of Germany for the rest of the season.

On November 1, 2014, Seeley was selected by the Delaware 87ers with the 19th overall pick in the 2014 NBA Development League Draft. On April 9, 2015, after the end of the 2014–15 D-League season, he signed a one-month contract with La Bruixa d'Or Manresa of the Spanish Liga ACB.

On July 26, 2015, Seeley signed with Beşiktaş of Turkey. On December 2, 2015, he left Beşiktaş and signed with Herbalife Gran Canaria for the rest of the season.

On June 28, 2016, Seeley signed a one-year deal, with an option for another one, with Israeli club Maccabi Tel Aviv.

On June 27, 2017, Seeley returned to Gran Canaria for a second stint, signing a one-year deal.

On August 13, 2018, Seeley signed with the Lithuanian team Rytas Vilnius for the 2018–19 season.

On July 29, 2019, Seeley signed with a one-year deal, with an option for another one, Spanish club Casademont Zaragoza. After averaging 11 points, three rebounds and 2.5 assists per game, Seeley re-signed with the team on July 2, 2020. He averaged 13.1 points, 2.3 rebounds and 1.7 assists per game. On December 3, Seeley signed with Bayern Munich of the Basketball Bundesliga.

On August 1, 2021, he has signed with Buducnost VOLI of the Adriatic League and the Prva A Liga.

On July 30, 2022, he has signed with BCM Gravelines-Dunkerque of the LNB Pro A.

On January 18, 2023, he has signed with Bayern Munich of the Basketball Bundesliga.

Career statistics

EuroLeague

|-
| style="text-align:left;"| 2016–17
| style="text-align:left;"| Maccabi
| 26 || 14 || 20.2 || .430 || .378 || .887 || 2 || 2.6 || 0.5 || 0.2 || 7.3 || 7.0
|-
|- class="sortbottom"
| style="text-align:left;"| Career
| style="text-align:left;"|
| 26 || 14 || 20.2 || .430 || .378 || .887 || 2 || 2.6 || 0.5 || 0.2 || 7.3 || 7.0

References

External links
 DJ Seeley at acb.com 
 Cal State Fullerton Titans bio
 D. J. Seeley at eurobasket.com
 D. J. Seeley at euroleague.net
 D. J. Seeley at fiba.com
 D. J. Seeley at tblstat.net

1989 births
Living people
20th-century African-American people
21st-century African-American sportspeople
ABA League players
African-American basketball players
American expatriate basketball people in Germany
American expatriate basketball people in Israel
American expatriate basketball people in Lithuania
American expatriate basketball people in Montenegro
American expatriate basketball people in Serbia
American expatriate basketball people in Spain
American expatriate basketball people in Turkey
American men's basketball players
Basketball players from California
Basket Zaragoza players
Bàsquet Manresa players
BC Rytas players
BCM Gravelines players
Beşiktaş men's basketball players
California Golden Bears men's basketball players
Cal State Fullerton Titans men's basketball players
CB Gran Canaria players
Delaware 87ers players
FC Bayern Munich basketball players
KK Budućnost players
KK Radnički Kragujevac (2009–2014) players
Liga ACB players
Maccabi Tel Aviv B.C. players
Modesto Christian School alumni
People from Redding, California
Shooting guards